Elections to Trafford Council were held on 5 May 1994.  One-third of the council was up for election, with each successful candidate to serve a four-year term of office, expiring in 1998. The Conservative party retained overall control of the council.

After the election, the composition of the council was as follows:

Ward results

References

1994 English local elections
1994
1990s in Greater Manchester